Hubert's Castle (German:Schloß Hubertus) may refer to

 Hubertus Castle (novel) an 1895 German novel by Ludwig Ganghofer 
 Hubertus Castle (1934 film)
 Hubertus Castle (1954 film)
 Hubertus Castle (1973 film)